Langevåg is a village in Bømlo municipality in Vestland county, Norway. It is located on the southern tip of the island of Bømlo, along the Bømlafjorden. This makes it the fourth largest village in the municipality.

Norwegian County Road 541 goes through the village and ends at a ferry port that has a regular connection to the village of Buavåg in the municipality of Sveio across the fjord.  The village is a historic church site with the Old Bømlo Church (from the 1600s) and the new Bømlo Church (from 1960) both being located here.  The Langevåg Bygdetun community centre opened in 2005.

References

External links
Langevåg community centre 

Villages in Vestland
Bømlo